The 2014 Lamar Hunt U.S. Open Cup was the 101st edition of the oldest ongoing competition in American soccer. Qualification began in November 2013 in the fifth tier. The USSF announced the tournament format on April 24, 2014.

The defending champions D.C. United were eliminated in the 4th Round by the Rochester Rhinos. Seattle Sounders FC defeated the Philadelphia Union 3-1 (after extra time) to claim their 4th Open Cup championship in 6 years.

The cash prize amounts remain the same as last year. The champion receives $250,000 and the runner-up receives $60,000. Also, the team from each lower division that advanced the furthest received $15,000: Laredo Heat (USL PDL), Rochester Rhinos (USL Pro), and Atlanta Silverbacks (NASL).

Qualification 

All United States Division I (MLS), Division II (NASL) & Division III (USL Pro) teams qualify automatically.

 $: Winner of $15,000 bonus for advancing the furthest in the competition from their respective divisions.
 $$: Winner of $60,000 for being the runner-up in the competition.
 $$$: Winner of $250,000 for winning the competition.

Brackets

Entries

Match Details

First Round 
The First Round draw was announced Thursday, April 24, 2014. A total of 16 teams will compete, ten from the fourth tier of American soccer and six from the fifth tier.

Second Round 
The Second Round draw was announced Thursday, April 24, 2014. A total of 48 teams will compete, including the eight winners from the first round and 40 new entries from the 3rd and 4th tiers of American soccer. The lowest ranked teams in this round are RWB Adria, Red Force FC, and PSA Elite of the 5th tier United States Adult Soccer Association.

Third Round 
A total of 32 teams will compete in the Third Round, including the 24 winners from the previous round and eight teams from the North American Soccer League. The lowest ranked teams in this round are RWB Adria and PSA Elite of the  5th tier United States Adult Soccer Association.

Fourth Round 
A total of 32 teams will compete in the Fourth Round, including the 16 winners from the previous round and 16 teams from Major League Soccer. The lowest ranked team in this round is PSA Elite of the  5th tier United States Adult Soccer Association.

 Game was suspended after 48:33 due to weather.

Fifth Round 
A total of 16 teams will compete in the Fifth Round, all of which have progressed from the previous round. The lowest qualified side in this round are the Rochester Rhinos of the 3rd tier USL Professional Division.

Quarterfinals 
The lowest ranked teams in the quarterfinals are the Atlanta Silverbacks and Carolina RailHawks, both of the 2nd tier North American Soccer League.

Semifinals 
Of the teams that qualified for the semifinals of the 2014 Lamar Hunt U.S. Open Cup, all four come from Major League Soccer, the top tier of professional soccer in the United States.

Final

Top Goalscorers

References

External links 
 The Cup.us – Full Coverage of the US Open Cup

 
U.S. Open Cup
U.S. Open Cup